Bristol Fighter may refer to:
Bristol F.2 Fighter aircraft
Bristol Fighter (automobile), an automobile by Bristol Cars